Koninklijke Lyra was a Belgian football club that existed between 1909 and 1972. It was located in the city of Lier in the province of Antwerp.  Lyra is  the Latin name for Lier.

History

The club was founded in 1909 as Turn- en Sportvereniging Lyra, meaning Gym and Sport Association Lyra in Dutch. It registered to the FA the same year to become the matricule n°52. In 1913 the club took part to the second division where it remained until the promotion in 1932.  The first spell of the club at the highest level ended in 1938 when it finished 13th on 14. In 1934 the name changed to Koninklijke Maatschappij Lyra and then to Koninklijke Lyra in 1939.

Lyra achieved its best ranking ever on its first season in the first division with a 6th place. The other spells were 1943–44, 1946–51 and 1953–54.  In 1960 the club fell into the third division and decayed. On 12 April 1972 Lyra merged with its neighbour of K. Lierse S.K. to become K. Lierse S.V. with the matricule n°30 of Lierse. On 16 June 1972 a new club named K. Lyra T.S.V. was founded with the matricule n°7776. It now plays in the Promotion C.

The team, and its successor K. Lyra T.S.V., played for over 100 years at the same stadium located in the center of Lier at the Mechelsesteenweg.

Honours
Belgian Second Division:
Winners (4): 1931–32, 1942–43, 1945–46, 1952–53
Belgian Cup:
Runners-up (1): 1934–35

Former famous players
 Jef Piedfort
 Raymond Van Gestel

References

External links
 RSSSF Archive – 1st and 2nd division final tables

 
Association football clubs established in 1909
Defunct football clubs in Belgium
Association football clubs disestablished in 1972
1909 establishments in Belgium
1972 disestablishments in Belgium
Organisations based in Belgium with royal patronage
Belgian Pro League clubs